The Sun Odyssey 36 is a French sailboat that was designed by Daniel Andrieu and J&J Design as a cruiser and first built in 1990.

The Sun Odyssey 36 is a development of the 1988 Sun Dance 36.

Production
The design was built by Jeanneau in France, from 1990 to 1992, but it is now out of production.

Design
The Sun Odyssey 36 is a recreational keelboat, built predominantly of fiberglass, with wood trim. The Hull is made from solid polyester fiberglass, with Kevlar reinforcement, while the deck is of balsa and polyester fiberglass sandwich construction. It has a masthead sloop rig, with a deck-stepped mast, two sets of swept spreaders and aluminum spars with discontinuous stainless steel wire rigging. The hull has a raked stem, a reverse transom with steps and a swim platform, an internally mounted spade-type rudder controlled by a wheel and a fixed fin keel or optional shoal-draft keel. The fin keel model displaces  and carries  of cast iron ballast, while the shoal-draft version displaces  and carries  of cast iron ballast.

The design has sleeping accommodation for six people, with a double "V"-berth in the bow cabin, an open "O"-shaped settee around an octagonal table on the starboard side and two aft cabins, each with a double berth. The galley is located on the port side, amidships opposite the salon table. The galley is equipped with a two-burner stove, an ice box and a double sink. A navigation station is aft of the galley, on the port side. There are two heads, one each just forward of the aft cabins, plus a sink in the bow cabin.

See also
List of sailing boat types

References

External links

Keelboats
1990s sailboat type designs
Sailing yachts
Sailboat type designs by Daniel Andrieu
Sailboat type designs by J&J Design
Sailboat types built by Jeanneau